Latin Alliance is the self-titled studio album by a one-off collaboration of Latino-American hip hop recording artists under Latin Alliance brand. The group was formed in 1989 and released their one and only album in 1991 via Virgin Records. It features performances by Kid Frost, A.L.T., Markski, Rayski Rockswell, Mellow Man Ace, Lyrical Engineer, Hip Hop Astronaut and The Lyrical Latin, with guest appearances by WAR and Scoop DeVille. Recording sessions took place at Digital Sound & Picture in New York City, Skyline Recording in Topanga, Wide Tracks, Image Recorders and Echo Sound in Los Angeles. Production was handled by Kid Frost, Tony G, Will Roc, Todd Alexander, Ralph Rivers, The Baka Boyz, Julio G, Geoff Rios and Mike Greene.

The ten-track album peaked at #133 on the Billboard 200, at #83 on the Top R&B/Hip-Hop Albums chart and at #18 on the Heatseekers Albums chart in the United States. It spawned two singles: "Lowrider (On the Boulevard)", a remake of WAR's hit single "Low Rider", and "Know What I'm Sayin'?". Its lead single, "Lowrider (On the Boulevard)", which was performed by Frost, A.L.T., Markski, Mellow Man Ace and WAR, made it to number 15 on the Hot Rap Songs chart. Latin Alliance is regarded as one of the pioneering albums of Hispanic hip hop, being one of the first albums to be released by a group of Latino rappers.

Track listing 

Sample credits
 "Lowrider (On The Boulevard)" sampled "Lowrider" by War and "Evil Ways" by Santana
 "What Is An American" sampled "Heartbeat" by War and "On Your Face" by Earth, Wind & Fire
 "Know What I'm Sayin'?" sampled "Nautilus" by Bob James and "Life Is Just A Moment" by Roy Ayers
 "What You See Is What You Get" sampled "What You See Is What You Get" by The Dramatics
 "Latinos Unidos (United Latins)" sampled "Funky Nassau" by ATC, "Mr. Groove" by One Way Band, "Cut The Lake" by The Average White Band and "Just Let It Play" by Gonzales
 "Can U Feel It" sampled "I.O.U." by Freeze
 "Smooth Roughness" sampled "Hang Up Your Hang-Ups" by Herbie Hancock

Personnel

Arturo Molina, Jr. – vocals, producer (tracks: 1-4, 6), additional producer (track 5)
Alvin Trivette – vocals
Mark Santiago – vocals
Ray Ramos – vocals
Ulpiano Sergio Reyes – vocals
George Anthony Perez – vocals
Elijah Blue Molina – vocals
Hip Hop Astronaut – vocals
The Lyrical Latin – vocals
War – vocals
Ronnie King – keyboards (tracks: 5, 8)
Vincent La Bauve – guitar (tracks: 5, 10)
Darrell "Bob Dog" Robertson – guitar (track 4)
D.J. Milner – bass (track 10)
Mitch Rafel – saxophone (track 5), flute (track 10)
Tommy D. – harmonica (track 2)
"Professor" Dwight Baldwin – percussion (tracks: 2, 5, 6, 8, 10)
Antonio Gonzalez – percussion (tracks: 4, 6, 10), producer (tracks: 1, 2, 6, 7, 9), additional producer (track 5), mixing (tracks: 6, 9), arranging (track 10)
Todd Alexander – percussion (tracks: 5, 8), producer (tracks: 5, 6, 8)
Ralph Medrano – scratches (tracks: 1, 3-6)
Nick Vidal – scratches (tracks: 6, 8-10), producer (tracks: 9, 10), additional producer (track 8), mixing (track 9)
Julio Gonzalez – scratches (track 9), producer (track 6)
Kevin Gilliam – scratches (track 4)
William L. Griffin – producer (tracks: 1, 3, 4, 6), mixing (track 6)
Ralph Rivers – producer (tracks: 5, 6, 8)
Eric Vidal – producer (tracks: 9, 10), additional producer (track 8)
Geoff Rios – producer (track 6)
Mike Greene – producer (track 6)
Jason Roberts – mixing (track 1), engineering
John Cevetello – mixing (track 6), engineering
Bob Drake – engineering, mixing
Josh Schneider – engineering, mixing
Stephen Marcussen – mastering
Steve J. Gerdes – art direction
Tom Dolan – design
Jackie Sallow – photography

Charts

References

External links

1991 debut albums
1991 compilation albums
Frost (rapper) albums
Virgin Records albums
Latin hip hop albums
West Coast hip hop albums
Collaborative albums